The 2014–15 Talk 'N Text Tropang Texters season was the 25th season of the franchise in the Philippine Basketball Association (PBA).

Key dates
July 9: Talk 'N Text Tropang Texters head coach Norman Black was moved to the Meralco Bolts, replacing Ryan Gregorio as head coach. Replacing Black in Talk 'N Text is assistant coach Jong Uichico.
August 24: The 2014 PBA draft took place in Midtown Atrium, Robinson Place Manila.
January 9, 2015: Jimmy Alapag formally announced his retirement during a press conference at the Smart Araneta Coliseum prior to the second game of the 2014–15 PBA Philippine Cup Finals between the Alaska Aces and the San Miguel Beermen.
March 5: The team retired the jersey number of Jimmy Alapag during the All-Star Weekend, where he was also added as the 13th man of the South All-Stars.

Draft picks

Roster

Philippine Cup

Eliminations

Standings

Game log

Playoffs

Bracket

Commissioner's Cup

Eliminations

Standings

Game log

Playoffs

Bracket

Governors' Cup

Eliminations

Standings

Bracket

Game log

Transactions

Trades

Pre-season

Recruited imports

(* Asian import)

References

TNT Tropang Giga seasons
Talk 'N Text